Banovci  is a village in the municipality of Bebrina in the central part of Brod-Posavina county. From the 2011 census the village had a population of 400 inhabitants in which over 90% declare themselves Croats, other residents are Ukrainians and others.

Geography 
It is located 20 km southwest of Slavonski Brod, 3 km north of Bosnia.

Gallery

References

Populated places in Brod-Posavina County